Peter Ferdinand Funck   (1788 – 7 January 1859) was a Danish violinist and composer.

See also
List of Danish composers

References
This article was initially translated from the Danish Wikipedia.

Danish composers
Male composers
Danish classical violinists
Male classical violinists
1788 births
1859 deaths
19th-century male musicians